This article constitutes a list of rocket launch sites. Some of these sites are known as spaceports or cosmodromes. A single rocket launch is sufficient for inclusion in the table, as long as the site is properly documented through a reference. Missile locations with no launches are not included in the list. Proposed and planned sites and sites under construction are not included in the main tabulation, but may appear in condensed lists under the tables.

A shorter list of spaceports for human spaceflight and satellite launches is available in the article Spaceport.

Table specification

Sorting order
 Countries in alphabetical order within a table
 Launch sites within a country are sorted chronologically according to start of operations

Column specification
 Country – territory of the site (the organisation responsible for the launches may reside elsewhere, as indicated in the notes column;
 Location – Name of launch site (sometimes also province etc.)
 Coordinates – geographical coordinates
 Operational date – the period of years of launch activities
 Number of rocket launches – the total number of launches, including failed launches
 Heaviest rocket launched – total mass at lift-off
 Highest achieved altitude – height in km above launch site (unless orbital)
 Notes – comments

Major/active spaceports are shown in bold.

Africa

Asia
Note that some Russian cosmodromes appear in this section, some in the Europe section.

Proposed or planned spaceports and rocket launch sites in Asia
 Biak Spaceport, Indonesia
 Kulasekarapattinam Spaceport, Tamil Nadu, India.

Europe

Note that some European countries operate spaceports in Africa, South America, or other equatorial regions. These spaceports are listed in this article according to their geographical location. Some Russian-controlled launch sites are listed as being in Asia. Note that some Russian cosmodromes appear in this section, some in the section Asia.

Proposed or planned spaceports in Europe
 Spaceport Sweden, Kiruna
 Newquay, Cornwall, England, UK
 Sutherland spaceport, Scotland, UK Was formally approved by the Scotland Highland Council in August 2020
 Santa Maria, Azores, Portugal
 Andøya Spaceport, Norway
El Hierro Launch Centre, Canary Islands, Spain 
 Taranto-Grottaglie Airport, Italy

North America

Additional rocket launch sites in North America
Please delete items or move them to the table above with appropriate data and references.

 Barbados, 
 Barter Island (United States)
 Black Mesa (United States)
 Cecil Airport, (United States)
 Charlestown, Rhode Island (United States)
 Cape Parry (Canada)
 Cold Lake (Canada)
 Datil (United States)
 Eareckson (Aleut islands, United States)
 Edwards Air Force Base (United States)
 Eglin Air Force Base (United States)
 Fort Bliss (United States)
 Fort Greely (United States)
 Fort Sherman (United States)

 Fort Wingate (United States)
 Fort Yukon (United States)
 Gillam (Canada)
 Gilson Butte (United States)
 Grand Turk Island )
 Green River Launch Complex
 Holloman (United States)
 Mercury (United States)
 NAOTS (United States)
 North Truro Air Force Station (United States)
 Point Arguello (United States)
 Point Barrow(United States)
 Point Mugu (United States)

 Primrose Lake (Canada)
 Ramey (Puerto Rico, United States)
 Red Lake (Canada)
 San Clemente (California, United States)
 San Nicolas Island (California, United States)
 Sheboygan (Wisconsin, United States, |)
 Sierra de Juarez (Mexico)
 Sondre Stromfjord (Greenland)
 Tonopah Test Range (United States)
 Yuma (United States)

Proposed or planned spaceports in North America
 Cape Breton Spaceport (aka Cape Breton Space Centre), Nova Scotia
 Cape Rich, LFCATC Meaford, Ontario
 Oklahoma Spaceport, Burns Flat,
 Silver Space Ports, Arizona
 Spaceport Washington, Moses Lake, Washington This project was proposed in 2005 by a small real estate brokerage firm operating from an office in Renton, Washington, and has since proven to have been a scam. The principal party - Mr. Andy Shin Fong Chen, CEO of ASPI Group, LLC - was charged with fraud by the U.S. Securities and Exchange Commission on 15 March 2017. No licensing was ever issued by any local, state or Federal government agency, nor was any construction ever initiated.

South America

Oceania

Past and/or planned only
 Weipa, on the Cape York Peninsula, Queensland. The Cape York Space Agency was established by the government to develop a launch facility for Ukrainian Zenit launches at Weipa. However, traditional owners represented by the Cape York Land Council blocked the proposal.
 Christmas Island, Australian external territory.
Site planned 1997 by the Asia Pacific Space Centre, but did not go ahead due to insufficient backing.
Japan Aerospace Exploration Agency (JAXA) conducted Phase I of a High Speed Flight Demonstration (HSFD) at Aeon Field on Christmas Island in 2002.

Launches at sea

Additional rocket launch sites in the oceans and Antarctica
Please delete items or move them to the table above with appropriate data and references.

 Ascension Island (Atlantic island)
 Barking Sands (Pacific island)
 Base Matienzo (Antarctica)
 Bigen Island (Marshall Islands )
 Bikini Atoll (Atoll in the Pacific, launches in conjunction with nuclear bomb tests)
 Dumont d'Urville (Antarctica)

 Eniwetok (Atoll in the Pacific, launches in conjunction with nuclear bomb tests)
 Guam)
 Johnston Atoll (Pacific island)
 Kerguelen (South Pacific island)
 Kindley Air Force Base (Bermuda islands)
 McMurdo Station (Antarctica)

 Molodyozhnaya (Antarctica))
 Rarotonga (Cook Islands)
 Rothera (Antarctica)
 Siple (Antarctica)
 Syowa Base (Antarctica)
 Vicecomodoro Marambio Station (Antarctica)
 Wake Island (Pacific island)

See also

 Launch pad
 Spaceport, including lists of spaceports that have achieved satellite launches and launches of humans
 List of launch complexes

References

External links
 Overview of rocket launch sites worldwide – astronautix.com
 Kennedy Space Center, Cape Canaveral – nasa.gov
 Description and map of Cape Canaveral – astronautix.com
 Missile Range Tool – Carlos Labs
 Baikonur – russianspaceweb.com
 Description and map of Baikonur – astronautix.com
 Description and map of Kourou – astronautix.com
 Rocket launch site Kiruna – astronautix.com
 Homepage of Esrange – ssc.se
 Rocket launch site Salto di Quirra – astronautix.com

Rocket Launch Sites
+Rocket Launch Sites